Cause I Sez So is the fourth studio album (and second after their reunion) by the New York Dolls. It was released on May 5, 2009, by Atco Records. The album was produced by Todd Rundgren, who also produced their self-titled debut album. One of the songs, "Trash", is a reggae-style remake of a song that originally appeared on their debut album. The album peaked at number 159 at the Billboard 200.

Critical reception 

Cause I Sez So was met with generally positive reviews. At Metacritic, which assigns a normalised rating out of 100 to reviews from mainstream publications, it received an average score of 73, based on 17 reviews.

Michaelangelo Matos of The A.V. Club found the album "life-affirming" overall, while The Daily Telegraph critic Andrew Perry said the Dolls are "in rude creative health" on their "tidiest [album] ever, and their most contemplative". The Boston Globes Jonathan Perry regarded it as "classic New York Dolls" full of "heart, soul, and swagger", and concluded, "Johansen's bowery rasp still has the texture of old shoe leather, but against improbable odds and the ravages of time, it somehow works beautifully." While surprised at the band's newfound appreciation for "a range of rock styles so disdained by punk", Andy Gill of The Independent believed the album is "far better than we had any right to expect". Writing for MSN Music, Robert Christgau conceded it is the first of the Dolls' albums that is "less than epochal", but ultimately observed redeeming qualities:

Steve Kandell from Spin was more critical, disregarding Cause I Sez So as "all fun and harmless garage blooze ... ultimately as trifling as their '73 debut was essential".

Track listing

Personnel
New York Dolls
David Johansen – vocals
Sylvain Sylvain – guitar
Steve Conte – guitar
Sami Yaffa – bass
Brian Delaney – drums

Charts

References

New York Dolls albums
2009 albums
Albums produced by Todd Rundgren
Atco Records albums